In 16th to 19th century Europe and North America, the slop trade was the manufacture and sale of slop, cheap ready-made clothing that was made by slop-workers and sold in slop-shops by slop-sellers.

Slop 
The name "slop" was originally naval slang for the cheap ready-made clothing that a naval rating would purchase in lieu of an official uniform (which ratings in the British Royal Navy, at least, did not have until 1857) sometimes from a "slop chest" maintained on board ship by the purser.

The trade 
The trade originated in government purchases of uniforms for soldiers and sailors; said uniforms being standardized and mass-produced rather than tailored to individuals, made to official specifications with rules about materials and shapes.The rise in the slop trade was particularly spurred on by wartime orders for military clothing, such as during the Nine Years War and the War of the Spanish Succession.

The slop trade was flourishing by the 18th century, as slop-sellers realized that they could sell to the general public as well as to the army and navy, and also received a boost from the Napoleonic Wars.
Slop work became organized into a system of large clothing warehouses subcontracting out to small workshops or individuals.
In the 19th century, however, "slop" was to gain a negative connotation, because of an economic conflict with the older bespoke tailoring industry.

In the U.K. the rise of industrialization led to a growing workforce of largely female slop-worker labour, working on piecework, paid by the item, from home, which grew to outnumber the largely male workforce of craft tailors who in contrast worked in a master tailor's workshop and were paid by time worked.
In 1824 the ratio of the former to the latter in London was 4:1, but by 1849 it was 3:20.
The gender disparity had been created by exclusionary practices in the craft tailoring trade in the late 18th and early 19th century, as male tailors sought to exclude women.

Similar factors were at work elsewhere; such as in Baltimore in the United States, where large tailoring enterprises such as Thomas Sheppard and Nathaniel Childs took to styling themselves "tailor and slop seller".
An increasingly female population with a growing number of female household heads provided a ready workforce of cheaper lesser-skilled female labour.

In London, cheap ready-made clothing gained a wider market through increased middle-class and working-class incomes in the latter part of the century, and a succession of strikes organized by tailors unions (in 1827, 1830, and 1834) largely failed.
The women slop-workers were seen as, and sometimes used as, strike-breakers, particularly in the London Tailors' Union strike of 1834 (which sought better wages, shorter hours, and a prohibition of the piecework and homework that slop-work involved); and contemporary commentators (such as Henry Mayhew who interviewed clothes sellers and Charles Kingsley in both his Cheap Clothes and Nasty and Alton Locke, Tailor and Poet) painted the traditional tailoring trade's view of the situation as the "honourable" traditional tradesmen (also known as "Flints") versus the "dishonourable" slop-workers (named "Dungs") who worked in sweat-shops, and the de-skilling of what was once skilled labour.

The clothing, also, was criticized for its poor quality, especially those slops that were made of shoddy, and for its exploitation of mainly the low-skilled women workers in the industry whose jobs involved minute parts of the overall process of the production of the clothes.

See also 
Parramatta cloth was one type of slop cloth made of woolen, and there were flax linen cloths for convict clothing that women convicts made at the Parramatta Female Factory.

Cross-reference

Sources

 
 
 
 
 
 
 

Clothing industry